Christian Javier Akselman (born 17 August 1974 in Buenos Aires) is an Argentine former footballer who played for clubs of Argentina, Chile and Ecuador.

References
 Profile at BDFA 
 Profile at En una Baldosa 
 Profile at Fútbol XXI 

1974 births
Living people
Argentine expatriate footballers
Argentine footballers
Argentine people of German descent
Racing Club de Avellaneda footballers
Club Almagro players
Club Atlético Tigre footballers
C.S. Emelec footballers
Unión Española footballers
Chilean Primera División players
Argentine Primera División players
Expatriate footballers in Chile
Expatriate footballers in Ecuador
Argentina youth international footballers
Association football midfielders
Footballers from Buenos Aires